The Riot Peddlers are a hardcore punk band formed by Ashwin Dutt and Arun Singh Ravi in 2010.
Current Members of the band: Ashwin Dutt (Drums), Arun S Ravi (Vocals/Guitar), Animesh Das (Bass).
They are India’s very first hardcore punk act.

Critical reception

References

External links
Artist Profile at Musicfellas
Band Page on Last.fm

Indian hardcore punk groups
Musical groups established in 2010
2010 establishments in India